MV Calumet is Great Lakes bulk freighter currently in operation.

Ship history
The ship was built in 1973 by the American Ship Building Company at Lorain, Ohio as the William R. Roesch for the Union Commerce Bank, Ohio, and managed by Kinsman Marine Transit. The Roesch sailed for the subsidiary of Oglebay-Norton Marine, the Pringle Transit Company, from 1976 to 1994, when she was transferred to Oglebay-Norton, which also marked the end of Pringle Transit. She was renamed David Z. Norton, after company founder David Zadock Norton on March 31, 1995. 

In 2006, Oglebay-Norton sold its fleet of River class ships to Grand River Navigation and the Wisconsin and Michigan Steamship Company of Avon Lake and Lakewood, Ohio. The Norton went to the WAMSC, along with Earl W. Oglebay and Wolverine, and was renamed David Z.. The ship was sold to Rand Logistics in 2008, being renamed Calumet,  after the original Calumet, built in 1929 for US Steel, which was scrapped in 2007.

On October 21, 2021 MV Calumet ran aground near the Lake State Railway swing bridge across the Saginaw River in Bay City but was quickly freed by tugs.

References

1973 ships
Great Lakes freighters
Ships built in Lorain, Ohio